This is a list of Nigerian films scheduled for theatrical release in 2019.

2019

January–March

April–June

July–September

October–November

See also
2019 in Nigeria
List of Nigerian films

References

External links
2019 films at the Internet Movie Database
Nigerian actors and actresses biography at Uzomedia TV

2019
Lists of 2019 films by country or language
Films